Huw Jones may refer to:
 Huw Jones (bishop) (1934–2016), Welsh Anglican bishop
 Huw Jones (cricketer) (born 1980), English cricketer
 Huw Jones (rugby union) (born 1993), Scottish rugby union player
 Huw Robert Jones (1894–1930), Welsh nationalist activist
 Huw Ceredig Jones (1942–2011), Welsh actor
 Simon Huw Jones (born 1960), British musician
  Huw Jones (singer), singer-songwriter, co-founder in 1969 of the Welsh record label Sain